The 2013 Women's Oceania Handball Championship was the sixth edition of the Oceania Handball Nations Cup, held on 26 and 27 April 2013 at Wellington, New Zealand.

Australia and New Zealand played in a two-legged game against each other, the aggregate winner qualified for the 2013 World Women's Handball Championship in Serbia.

Results

All times are local (UTC+13).

Game 1

Game 2

References

External links
Results at todor66.com
Oceania Continent Handball Federation webpage

2013 Women
Women's Oceania Handball Championship
Women's Oceania Handball Championship
International handball competitions hosted by New Zealand
Women's handball in New Zealand
Sports competitions in Wellington
April 2013 sports events in New Zealand
2010s in Wellington